Saint-Amans-Valtoret is a commune in the Tarn department and Occitanie region of southern France.

Geography
The river Thoré forms the commune's southern border.

See also
Communes of the Tarn department

References

Communes of Tarn (department)